Panagiotis "Takis" Vougiouklakis (6 March 1939 – 7 April 2021) was a Greek director and producer.

Biography 
Vougiouklakis was born in Athens and is the relative of the former prefectural leader of Arcadia, judge Ioannis Vougiouklakis and Aimilis Koumoundourou.

He was the brother of Aliki Vougiouklaki.

He began and finished his studies in Rome, Italy and began at the Pro-Deo University where he studied and went on to work as a director at the Centro Sperimentale di Cinematografia (CSC).

In his first vocational step, he worked as second unit director, next to the best Greek and foreign directors of the Golden Age of Greek film. He effectively directed in 1963, began his radio directors for 40 theatrical works and then in television with many serials, shows and celebrated programs. He began directing films in 1970.

His next artwork tribunes were the theatrical script anevazondas and 52 musicals, comedies, dramas, etc. by 2008. In 1975 he became a show businessman.

He ran a movie production and theatrical companies and television programming.

He was BD member of Arma Thespidos (National Theatrical Stage) for three years as General Μanager.

He worked as a consultant for the Ministry of Culture. For several years, he was a member of the Critics Commission at the Thessaloniki Film Festival. He was councillor of ANT1 TV station and general commissioner of the Intellectual Property of Writers and Directors. He was elected Public Councillor of the municipality of Vrilissia; he became president of the city's Cultural Center. He was elected again and became president of that municipality's public council.

Vougiouklakis died on 7 April 2021 at the age of 82.

Filmography

References

External links 
 

1939 births
2021 deaths
Greek theatre directors
Film people from Athens
Centro Sperimentale di Cinematografia alumni